"3" is a song by American heavy metal band Disturbed, released as a digital download on April 28, 2011. It was later made available on the band's B-side compilation album, The Lost Children. The song is about the West Memphis Three.

Background
In the July 2010 issue of Metal Hammer magazine, guitarist Dan Donegan talked about the song: "There's also a song about the West Memphis Three...these kids that came from this Bible Belt town and just because they wore black and listened to heavy metal they were found guilty of murder, even though there was no evidence!".

On April 27, 2011, the band's official website posted a new entry announcing that a new song will be released the next day exclusively on the band's official page, and "100% of the proceeds will be going to benefit a very special cause".

On April 28, 2011, it was revealed that "3" is the song that was released, also announcing that every proceed will benefit the Damien Echols Defense Fund.

References

Disturbed (band) songs
2011 songs
Songs written by Dan Donegan
Songs written by David Draiman
Songs written by Mike Wengren